Kaohsiung City Constituency I includes districts in the eastern part of Kaohsiung. The district was formerly known as Kaohsiung County Constituency I (2008-2010) and was created in 2008, when all local constituencies of the Legislative Yuan were reorganized to become single-member districts. Its current representative is Chiu Yi-ying.

Current district
 Taoyuan
 Namasia
 Jiasian
 Liouguei
 Shanlin
 Neimen
 Cishan
 Meinong
 Maolin
 Alian
 Tianliao
 Yanchao
 Dashe
 Dashu

Legislators

Electoral Results

2008

2012

2016

References 

2008 establishments in Taiwan
Constituencies in Kaohsiung